This is a reversed chronological list of peace proposals in the Middle East, often abbreviated under the Mideast peace concept.

Egyptian Crisis reconciliation
Egyptian constitutional referendum, 2012
Egyptian constitutional referendum, 2014

Syrian Civil War peace process
 Arab League peace plan
 Arab League observers mission December 2011–January 2012
 Russian resolution proposal on Syrian uprising
 Kofi Annan Syrian peace plan February–August 2012
 United Nations Supervision Mission in Syria
 Lakhdar Brahimi Syrian peace plan – since August 17, 2012
 U.S.–Russia peace proposals on Syria – May 2013 proposal to organise a peace conference
 Geneva II Conference on Syria – January 2014
 2015 Zabadani cease-fire agreement – between Syrian Opposition and Assad Government
 Vienna peace talks for Syria
 Four committees initiative
 Geneva III
 Geneva IV

Yemeni Crisis reconciliation
 Yemeni crisis reconciliation attempts
 Yemeni presidential election, 2012

Fatah–Hamas reconciliation talks

 Fatah–Hamas Mecca Agreement (2007)
 2011 Cairo accords (2011)
 Fatah–Hamas Doha Agreement (2012)
 May 2012 Cairo agreement
 2014 Fatah–Hamas Gaza Agreement
 2017 Fatah–Hamas Agreement

Iran nuclear talks

 P5+1, 2006 diplomatic efforts
 Iran nuclear deal framework
 Joint Plan of Action (2013)
 Joint Comprehensive Plan of Action (2015)
 February 2019 Warsaw Conference

Iraq War peace proposals
 United Nations Security Council Resolution 1441
 Failed Iraqi peace initiatives
 Iraqi Leaders Initiative 2006
 Blair's tests for Iraq disarmament

Gulf War peace initiatives
 Geneva Peace Conference (1991)
 United Nations Security Council Resolution 687 – April 1991
 United Nations Security Council Resolution 1154 – 1998

Turkish–Kurdish conflict negotiations
 Turkey–PKK peace talks (1999–2004, unsuccessful)
 Solution process (2012–2015, failed)

Internal Lebanese reconciliation
 17 May Agreement – during the Lebanese civil war
 Tripartite Accord (Lebanon) – 1985 agreement to end the Lebanese civil war
 Taif Agreement – Lebanese civil war peace accords
 Doha Agreement – 2008 Lebanese reconciliation agreement, following 2007–2008 crisis

Cyprus conflict pacification attempts
 Establishment of UN peace force in Cyprus (1964)
 UNSC resolution 355 (1974)
 Annan reunification plan for Cyprus
 United Nations Security Council Resolution 1250 (1999)
 Cypriot Annan Plan referendums, 2004
 2008–2012 Cyprus talks
 2014 Cyprus talks
 2015–2017 Cyprus talks

Iraqi–Kurdish conflict peace negotiations
 Kurdish Civil War peace accords (finalized in 1997)
 1975 Algiers Agreement
 Kurdish–Iraqi peace talks (1970–1974, unsuccessful)
 Recognition of Kurdish Government by Iraq

Arab–Israeli peace diplomacy and treaties

Arab League–Israel accords
 Peace proposals of Count Folke Bernadotte (1948)
 1949 Armistice Agreements
 UN Security Council Resolution 242  (November 22, 1967)
 Jarring Mission (1967–1971)
 Allon Plan (July 26, 1967)
 Rogers Plan (1969)
 Camp David Accords (1978)
 Egypt–Israel peace treaty (1979)
 Fahd Plan (1981)
 Reagan Plan (September 1, 1982)
 Fez Initiative (September 9, 1982)
 May 17 Agreement, a failed attempt of peace between Lebanon and Israel (1983)
 Israel–Jordan peace treaty (1994)
 Arab Peace Initiative (March 28, 2002)
 Abraham Accords (2020)
 Israel–Sudan normalization agreement (2020)

Israeli–Palestinian peace process

 Madrid Conference of 1991
 Oslo Accords (1993)
 Wye River Memorandum (October 23, 1998)
 Camp David 2000 Summit (2000)
 The Clinton Parameters (December 23, 2000)
 Taba summit (January, 2001)
 Elon Peace Plan (also known as "The Israel Initiative") (2002)
 The People's Voice (July 27, 2002)
 Road Map for Peace (April 30, 2003)
 Geneva Accord (October 20, 2003)
 Sharm el-Sheikh Summit of 2005 (February 8, 2005)
 2006 Franco-Italian-Spanish Middle East Peace Plan
 One-state solution
 Isratine (May 8, 2003)
 Two-state solution
 Three-state solution
 Israeli Peace Initiative (April 6, 2011)
 John Kerry Parameters (December 28, 2016)

Turkish War of Independence peace treaties
 Treaty of Alexandropol 1920
 Cilicia Peace Treaty 1921
 Treaty of Moscow (1921)
 Treaty of Kars 1921
 Treaty of Ankara (1921)
 Conference of London 1921–22
 Treaty of Lausanne (1923)
 Armistice of Mudanya 1922

WW I and post-war accords
 Sykes–Picot Agreement 1916
 McMahon–Hussein Correspondence 1916
 Treaty of Sèvres 1920
 Paris Peace Conference, 1919
 Faisal–Weizmann Agreement (1919)

Saudi-related peace treaties
 Uqair Protocol of 1922

See also
 Strategic reset
 UN General Assembly Resolution 3379

References

External links
 U.S. Attempts at Peace in the Middle East from the Dean Peter Krogh Foreign Affairs Digital Archives

Middle East peace efforts